William Christian Christianson (December 5, 1892 – May 27, 1985) was an American jurist. He was one of the judges at the Nuremberg Military Tribunals.

Early life and education 
Christianson was born in Moody County, South Dakota. He was the son of Christian O. Christianson (1857–1937) and Karen (Holter) Christianson (1862–1936). Christianson went to school in Austin, Minnesota, and Jasper, Minnesota. He earned a bachelor's degree from Highland Park College and then received his Juris Doctor from University of Chicago Law School in 1920.

Career 
Christianson was assistant county attorney for Goodhue County, Minnesota and Red Wing, Minnesota city attorney. Christianson served on the Minnesota Supreme Court from March 1946 to January 1947. In 1948 and 1949, Christianson was one of the judges of the Subsequent Nuremberg trials. In 1949, Christianson was appointed a Minnesota District Court judge for the first district and served until his retirement in 1963.

Personal life
Christianson was married to Myrtle Lorenz who died in 1977. Christianson died in Red Wing, Minnesota, in 1985. He was buried at Oakwood Cemetery in Goodhue County, Minnesota.

References

1892 births
1985 deaths
People from Red Wing, Minnesota
People from Moody County, South Dakota
University of Chicago Law School alumni
Minnesota state court judges
Justices of the Minnesota Supreme Court
Judges of the United States Nuremberg Military Tribunals
American Lutherans
American people of Norwegian descent
20th-century American judges
20th-century Lutherans